Bradshaigh is a surname. Notable people with the surname include:

 Bradshaigh baronets
 Roger Bradshaigh (disambiguation), multiple people
William de Bradshaigh (fl. 1313–1331), English politician